Gahan Wilson's The Ultimate Haunted House is a computer adventure game developed by Byron Preiss Multimedia/Brooklyn Multimedia, published and distributed by Microsoft Home, and directed by Judson Rosebush. The game is designed by Walt Freitag and Barbara Lanza and published in 1993 and 1994. The game places the player in the middle of a bizarrely humorous and eerie haunted house populated by Wilson's wacky characters. The player must explore 13 rooms and find 13 hidden keys before 13 hours on the mystery clock run out. The game runs on Mac OS 7 and Microsoft Windows 3.1.

Gameplay
Game play consists of interacting with a cast of ghoulish residents who populate the house and move about it, and in collecting and exchanging an inventory of items with them. All of the main characters, as well as the house itself, contain artificial personalities that react to the actions of the player; the moody characters and the opportunity to explore the house in any order creates near-infinite replayability. Dozens of activities and puzzles embedded in the game also have consequences. These activities include a monster assembly lab, monster movies in the screening room, cooking a concoction in the kitchen, composing an organ tune, and other traditional puzzle games adapted to the computer. The game contains many clever voices and the opening tune "Monster Mash".

A cast of characters populate the house and make appearances throughout in the game. These include Frankenstein, a vampiress, a two-headed monster, a mad scientist, and a normal human child (transported there by the mad scientist's lab ray). Gahan Wilson is a ghost in the game, but there are two Gahans: one good, one evil, and deciphering which is which is one of the elements of game play. The thirteen rooms include a menagerie, kitchen, foyer, torture chamber, the monster lab, the screening room, the game room, a library, an attic, a bathroom, a basement hallway, a music room, and an art gallery. There are also a variety of monsters whose interaction with the player is limited to placing curses upon them.

1993 video games
Adventure games
Classic Mac OS games
Video games developed in the United States
Windows games